West Vincent Highlands Historic District is a national historic district located in Upper Uwchlan Township and West Vincent Township, Chester County, Pennsylvania.

History 
The district includes 147 contributing buildings, seven contributing sites, and six contributing structures in a rural area of Chester County. It includes a variety of early- to mid-19th century vernacular farmhouses and related outbuildings. Other buildings include a stone grist mill (1808) and woolen mill (1813).

It was added to the National Register of Historic Places in 1998.

References

Historic districts on the National Register of Historic Places in Pennsylvania
Historic districts in Chester County, Pennsylvania
National Register of Historic Places in Chester County, Pennsylvania